The men's 400 metres hurdles event at the 1928 Olympic Games took place between July 29 & July 30. There were 25 athletes from 13 nations. The maximum number of athletes per nation was 4. The event was won by David Burghley of Great Britain, the first time a hurdler not from the United States had won. Americans Frank Cuhel and Morgan Taylor took silver and bronze. Taylor, who had been the defending champion, was the second man to win multiple medals in the 400 metres hurdles.

Background

This was the sixth time the event was held. It had been introduced along with the men's 200 metres hurdles in 1900, with the 200 being dropped after 1904 and the 400 being held through 1908 before being left off the 1912 programme. However, when the Olympics returned in 1920 after World War I, the men's 400 metres hurdles was back and would continue to be contested at every Games thereafter.

Two of the six finalists from the 1924 Games returned: gold medalist Morgan Taylor of the United States and silver medalist Erik Wilén of Finland. Taylor had won the 1924, 1925, and 1926 AAU titles and set a new world record at the U.S. Trials; he was favored in the event.

India and Poland each made their debut in the event. The United States made its sixth appearance, the only nation to have competed at every edition of the event to that point.

Competition format

The competition featured the three-round format introduced in 1908: quarterfinals, semifinals, and a final. Ten sets of hurdles were set on the course. The hurdles were 3 feet (91.5 centimetres) tall and were placed 35 metres apart beginning 45 metres from the starting line, resulting in a 40 metres home stretch after the last hurdle. The 400 metres track was now standard.

There were 6 quarterfinal heats, with between 3 and 6 athletes each. The top 2 men in each quarterfinal advanced to the semifinals. The 12 semifinalists were divided into 2 semifinals of 6 athletes each, with the top 3 in each semifinal advancing to the 6-man final.

Records

These were the standing world and Olympic records (in seconds) prior to the 1928 Summer Olympics.

Morgan Taylor set a new Olympic record with 53.4 seconds in the first semifinal. David Burghley matched that time in the final.

Schedule

Results

Quarterfinals

The first two finishers in each of the six heats advanced to the semifinal round.

Quarterfinal 1

Quarterfinal 2

Quarterfinal 3

Quarterfinal 4

Quarterfinal 5

Quarterfinal 6

Semifinals

Semifinal 1

Semifinal 2

Final

Results summary

References

Men's 400 metres hurdles
400 metres hurdles at the Olympics
Men's events at the 1928 Summer Olympics